Below is the list of populated places in Yalova Province, Turkey by the districts. In the following lists first place in each list is the administrative center of the district.

Yalova
	Yalova
	Elmalık, Yalova
	Esadiye, Yalova
	Güneyköy, Yalova
	Hacımehmet, Yalova
	Kadıköy, Yalova
	Kazımiye, Yalova
	Kirazlı, Yalova
	Kurtköy, Yalova
	Safran, Yalova
	Samanlı, Yalova
	Soğucak, Yalova
	Sugören, Yalova

Altınova
	Altınova
	Ahmediye, Altınova
	Aktoprak, Altınova
	Çavuşçiftliği, Altınova
	Fevziye, Altınova
	Geyikdere, Altınova
	Havuzdere, Altınova
	Hersek, Altınova
	Karadere, Altınova
	Kaytazdere, Altınova
	Örencik, Altınova
	Sermayecik, Altınova
	Soğuksu, Altınova
	Subaşı, Altınova
	Tavşanlı, Altınova
	Tevfikiye, Altınova
	Tokmak, Altınova

Armutlu
       Armutlu
	Fıstıklı, Armutlu
	Hayriye, Armutlu
	Kapaklı, Armutlu
	Mecidiye, Armutlu
	Selimiye, Armutlu

Çınarcık
	Çınarcık
	Çalıca, Çınarcık
	Esenköy, Çınarcık
	Kocadere, Çınarcık
	Koru, Çınarcık
	Ortaburun, Çınarcık
	Şenköy, Çınarcık
	Teşvikiye, Çınarcık

Çiftlikköy
       Çiftlikköy
	Burhaniye, Çiftlikköy
	Çukurköy, Çiftlikköy
	Denizçalı, Çiftlikköy
	Dereköy, Çiftlikköy
       Gacık, Çiftlikköy
	İlyasköy, Çiftlikköy
	Kabaklı, Çiftlikköy
	Kılıç, Çiftlikköy
	Laledere, Çiftlikköy
	Taşköprü, Çiftlikköy

Termal
	Termal
	Akköy, Termal
	Yenimahalle, Termal

References

Yalova Province
List